Caroline Fletcher (later Metten) (November 22, 1906 – April 3, 1998) was an American diver who competed in the 1924 Summer Olympics. In 1924 Fletcher won the bronze medal in the 3 metre springboard competition.

References

External links
profile

1906 births
American female divers
1998 deaths
Divers at the 1924 Summer Olympics
Olympic bronze medalists for the United States in diving
Medalists at the 1924 Summer Olympics
20th-century American women
20th-century American people